Saulsburg is an unincorporated community in Huntingdon County, in the U.S. state of Pennsylvania.

Etymology
Saulsburg derives its name from shortening and alteration of the last name of Henry "Sall" Widersall, a first settler.

References

Unincorporated communities in Pennsylvania
Unincorporated communities in Huntingdon County, Pennsylvania